Karahan Tepe is an archaeological site in Şanlıurfa Province in Turkey. The site is close to Göbekli Tepe and archaeologists have also uncovered T-shaped stelae there. According to Daily Sabah, "The excavations have uncovered 250 obelisks featuring animal figures" .

The site is located near Yağmurlu and roughly 46 kilometers east of Göbekli Tepe, which is often called its sister site. It is part of the Göbeklitepe Culture and Karahantepe Excavations project. The area is known as “Keçilitepe” by local people. It is part of a region of similar sites now being uncovered known as the Taş Tepeler.

History
The ancient structures at Karahan Tepe were discovered in 1997 by "researchers near the Kargalı neighborhood in the Tek Tek Mountains National Park."

Necmi Karul, an archeologist at Istanbul University, told Anadolu Agency in 2019, “Last year, excavation work restarted in Karahantepe [Kectepe] – around 60 km from where Göbeklitepe is located – and we encountered traces of special structures, obelisks, animal sculptures, and descriptions as well as similar symbolism”. The site was filled with dirt and rubble at some point, preserving T-topped columns carved into bedrock. These structures have been described as 'phallic totems'.

Site 
In Karahantepe, the archaeological fills cover an area of almost 10 hectares, which increases by another five hectares if the quarries for the T-shaped columns are included.

References

Further reading
 
 JUDITH SUDILOVSKY, 2022, "Oldest Neolithic settlements in Turkey redefine domestication, society" The Jerusalem Post, 27 May 2022: https://www.jpost.com/archaeology/article-707792

Tells (archaeology)
1997 archaeological discoveries
Archaeological sites in Southeastern Anatolia
Archaeological sites of prehistoric Anatolia
Buildings and structures in Şanlıurfa Province
History of Şanlıurfa Province
Lost ancient cities and towns
Megalithic monuments in the Middle East
Neolithic sites of Asia
Prehistoric art in Turkey
Prehistoric Anatolia